A pugil stick is a heavily padded pole-like training weapon used since the early 1940s by military personnel in training for rifle and bayonet combat. The pugil stick is similar to a quarterstaff or Japanese bo, and may be marked to indicate which end represents the bayonet and which the rifle butt. Dr. Armond H. Seidler (1919-2017) of the University of New Mexico invented the Pugil Stick training method during World War II. It was initially adopted by the United States Marine Corps, but was later included in United States Army combat training as well. Dr. Seidler received an award from the Marine Corps for his invention. 

Pugil bouts are usually conducted with hard contact while wearing protective gear such as groin protectors, American football helmets, hockey gloves, and chest protectors or shin guards, such as those worn by baseball catchers. Some pugil sticks are made with integrated hand guards to reduce the potential for injury. Military procedures for pugil bouts are often detailed, with United States Army and United States Marine Corps both prohibiting pugil training by anyone who has recently suffered concussion of the brain, lest they suffer traumatic brain injury, or had a tooth extraction within the past 24 hours.

The concept of the military pugil stick bout was adopted by the producers of the American television game show American Gladiators, who used it to create one of the physical events for the series called Joust (no relation to jousting); the object was for competitiors to use the sticks to knock the opponent off of a platform. 

The name "pugil stick" is a neologism from the Latin noun pugnus (fist), the source for other English words such as "pugilist" (boxer) and "pugnacious" (eager to fight).

See also 
Bayonet
German school of fencing
Jōdō
Jūkendō
Quarterstaff

References

External links 

 "Professor Tells the Marines". Popular Science - p. 77, July 1954, Vol. 165, No. 1.  Retrieved 31 January 2011

Training weapons
Military education and training